Browder v. Gayle, 142 F. Supp. 707 (1956), was a case heard before a three-judge panel of the United States District Court for the Middle District of Alabama on Montgomery and Alabama state bus segregation laws. The panel consisted of Middle District of Alabama Judge Frank Minis Johnson, Northern District of Alabama Judge Seybourn Harris Lynne, and Fifth Circuit Court of Appeals Judge Richard Rives. The main plaintiffs in the case were Aurelia Browder, Claudette Colvin, Susie McDonald, and Mary Louise Smith. Jeanetta Reese had originally been a plaintiff in the case, but intimidation by segregationists (including threatening phone calls and pressure from a senior police officer for whom she worked) caused her to withdraw in February. She falsely claimed she had not agreed to the lawsuit, which led to an unsuccessful attempt to disbar Fred Gray for supposedly improperly representing her.

On June 5, 1956, the District Court ruled 2-1, with Lynne dissenting, that bus segregation is unconstitutional under the Equal Protection Clause of the 14th Amendment to the U.S. Constitution.

The state and city appealed, and the decision was summarily affirmed by the United States Supreme Court on November 13, 1956.

Background
Shortly after beginning the Montgomery bus boycott in December 1955, black community leaders began to discuss filing a federal lawsuit to challenge the City of Montgomery and Alabama bus segregation laws. They sought a declaratory judgment that Alabama state statutes and ordinances of the city of Montgomery providing for and enforcing racial segregation on "privately"-operated buses were in violation of Fourteenth Amendment protections for equal treatment.

The cause of action was brought under Reconstruction-era civil rights legislation, specifically 42 U.S.C. sections 1981, 1983. The United States District Court had original jurisdiction to hear the case because it was a federal question (section 1331) and because it concerned civil rights (section 1343). A three-judge district court panel was required under 28 U.S.C. § 2281 for the granting of an interlocutory or the permanent injunction restraining the enforcement of a state statute by restraining the action of a state officer, such as an official of the Alabama Public Service Commission. The court held that since officials admitted that they were enforcing state statutes, a three-judge court had jurisdiction over the case.

About two months after the bus boycott began, civil rights activists reconsidered the case of Claudette Colvin. She was a 15-year-old girl who had been the first person arrested in 1955 for refusing to give up her seat on a Montgomery bus, nine months before Rosa Parks' action. Fred Gray, E.D. Nixon, president of the NAACP and secretary of the new Montgomery Improvement Association; and Clifford Durr (a white lawyer who, with his wife, Virginia Durr, was an activist in the Civil Rights Movement) searched for the ideal case law to challenge the constitutional legitimacy of Montgomery and Alabama bus segregation laws.

Durr was concerned that an appeal of Parks's case would get tied up in the Alabama state courts and thought that they needed a way to get directly to federal courts. Gray did research for the lawsuit and consulted with NAACP Legal Defense Fund attorneys Robert L. Carter and Thurgood Marshall (who would later become United States Solicitor General and the first African-American United States Supreme Court Justice). Gray approached Colvin, Aurelia Browder, Susie McDonald, Mary Louise Smith, and Jeanetta Reese, all women who had been discriminated against by drivers enforcing segregation policy in the Montgomery bus system. They agreed to become plaintiffs in a federal civil action lawsuit, thus bypassing the Alabama court system. Reese dropped out of the case in February 1956 because of intimidation by members of the white community. She falsely claimed she had not agreed to the lawsuit, which led to an unsuccessful attempt to disbar Gray for supposedly improperly representing her.

Decision
On February 1, 1956, Gray filed the case Browder v. Gayle in U.S. District Court. Aurelia Browder was a Montgomery woman, W. A. Gayle was the mayor of Montgomery.

On June 5, 1956, the District Court ruled that "the enforced segregation of black and white passengers on motor buses operating in the City of Montgomery violates the Constitution and laws of the United States" because the conditions deprived people of equal protection under the Fourteenth Amendment. The court further enjoined Alabama and Montgomery from continuing to operate segregated buses.

The state and city appealed the district court's decision to the U.S. Supreme Court. On November 13, 1956, the Supreme Court summarily affirmed the District Court's ruling and ordered Alabama and Montgomery to desegregate its buses. One month later, on December 17, the Supreme Court denied the state's petition for rehearing, and on December 20, the ruling was implemented after Gayle was handed official written notice by federal marshals.

Commemoration
In 2019 a statue of Rosa Parks was unveiled in Montgomery, Alabama, and four granite markers were also unveiled near the statue on the same day to honor four plaintiffs in Browder v. Gayle  - Aurelia Browder, Susie McDonald, Claudette Colvin, and Mary Louise Smith. One of those plaintiffs, Mary Louise Smith, took part in the unveiling ceremony.

See also 
Aurelia Browder
Claudette Colvin
Susie McDonald
Mary Louise Smith
Plessy v. Ferguson (1896), case upholding "separate but equal" accommodations
Brown v. Board of Education (1954), declared segregated schools were inherently unequal.
Bolling v. Sharpe (1954), found segregated schools in the District of Columbia were unconstitutional
Keys v. Carolina Coach Co. (1955), overturned Plessy v. Ferguson

References

External links 
 Text, Browder v. Gayle Judgment, Gilder Lehrman Center
District Court decision

United States Supreme Court cases
United States racial desegregation case law
Civil rights movement case law
Montgomery bus boycott
History of Montgomery, Alabama
African-American history of Alabama
1956 in United States case law
1956 in Alabama
United States Supreme Court cases of the Warren Court
Law articles needing an infobox